The 2014 NACRA sevens is an annual rugby sevens competition held for teams affiliated with the North America Caribbean Rugby Association. The competition was held between December 3 and 4 at the Campo Marte in Mexico City, Mexico. A total of twelve teams (including two from host nation Mexico) competed in the men's tournament.

In the men's gold medal match, Guyana managed to come back from being down 7–21 at half time to defeat Mexico. The top two teams in the men's competition, along with the winner of the women's competition qualified to compete at the 2015 Pan American Games in Toronto, Canada.

Pool stage
Men's schedule and results:

Pool A

Pool B

Pool C

Bowl Group

Elimination stage

Quarterfinals

Plate

Seventh place match

Fifth place match

Semifinals

Bronze medal match

Gold medal match

Final standings

See also
 2014 NACRA Women's Sevens

References

2014
2014 rugby sevens competitions
2014 in North American rugby union
International rugby union competitions hosted by Mexico
Qualification tournaments for the 2015 Pan American Games
rugby union